The Santa Cruz leaf-toed gecko (Phyllodactylus santacruzensis) is a species of gecko. It is endemic to Isla Santa Cruz in Mexico.

References

Phyllodactylus
Reptiles described in 1966